James Edmond (21 April 1859 – 21 March 1933) was a Scottish-Australian journalist and writer of short stories, and notable as an editor of The Bulletin.

Edmond was born in Glasgow, the son of James Edmond, carpet-maker, and his wife Janet, née Dickson. As a child Edmond had only a primary education, but in later years he did much reading at the Glasgow public library. He went to work when he was 12 years old, and at 16 was a clerk in a fire insurance office. In 1878 he emigrated to New Zealand and followed various occupations with little success. In 1882 he went to Victoria and then to Queensland. At Rockhampton in 1885 he obtained a position as proof-reader on The Morning Bulletin, and began to send contributions to the Sydney Bulletin. In 1886 J. F. Archibald invited him to join the staff and in 1890 he became associate-editor.

Edmond took charge of the 'Wild-Cat' column in 1893, and, though he then had little knowledge of finance, quickly realized that in order to write about it intelligently, the necessary facts must be available. He collected balance sheets, and years afterwards began that comparison of the current year's figures with those of earlier years, which has since been so generally adopted in financial columns in Australia. He was also one of the first men to realize how dangerous over-borrowing abroad could be, and for a long period consistently fought against it in the columns of The Bulletin. Edmond was more than a just writer on finance, he wrote humorous stories and sketches, leaders, dramatic criticism, paragraphs on all kinds of subjects and for some time a special column "The Brickbat slung by Titus Salt". In 1903 he became editor but still found time to do much writing.

Edmond was in many ways a good editor, but had little concept of how an editor's work might be delegated. This was bad for the training of the staff and, as was inevitable in the circumstances, Edmond's health broke down while he was still in his mid-fifties. Edmond was forced to retire in 1915. After four years' holiday he began to be a regular contributor again, but failing sight effectively prevented him from working during the last seven years of his life. After a courageous struggle with ill-health Edmond died at Sydney on 21 March 1933. His wife, a son, and three daughters survived him.

Of the large amount of Edmond's writings, very little has been collected. A Policy for the Commonwealth, a reprint of a series of articles in The Bulletin, appeared in 1900, and in 1913 A Journalist and Two Bears, consisting mostly of humorous Sketches from the Bulletin and the Lone Hand, was published. He had a great reputation as a humorist in his day which is now somewhat difficult to justify. He was associate-editor and editor of The Bulletin during the period when it was a power in the land, and did much in shaping its policy. He promoted Federation when it had little support in New South Wales, and his financial policy was generally sound. His strenuous writing against overseas borrowing had apparently little effect at the time, but the strong tendency in later years for governments to raise loans in Australia instead of overseas may have been largely a result of his work.

Edmund Close, in the Canberra suburb of Gilmore, is named in his honour.

References

Sylvia Lawson, 'Edmond, James (1859 - 1933)', Australian Dictionary of Biography, Volume 8, MUP, 1981, p. 413. Retrieved on 9 October 2008

1859 births
1933 deaths
Australian journalists
Australian magazine editors
Australian federationists
People from Rockhampton
20th-century Australian short story writers